Felix Lok Ying-kwan is a Hong Kong actor. His television appearances include roles in Looking Back in Anger, The Drive of Life and The Academy.

Filmography

Television series

Films
Heroes of the Underground (1976)
The Happenings (1979)
Sexy Career Girls (1981)
Lady Cop and Papa Crook (2008)
Connected (2008)
Claustrophobia (2008)
Overheard (2009)
Overheard 2 (2011)
Nightfall (2012)
Tales from the Dark 1 (2013)
Young and Dangerous: Reloaded (2013)
Overheard 3 (2014)
Z Storm (2014)
From Vegas to Macau II (2015)
Cold War 2 (2016)
Shock Wave (2017)
Project Gutenberg (2018)
Integrity (2019)
The Love of Immortal (2019)

References 

TVB veteran actors
Hong Kong male film actors
Living people
1952 births
Hong Kong male television actors
20th-century Hong Kong male actors
21st-century Hong Kong male actors